Zeffiro has been borne by at least three ships of the Italian Navy and may refer to:

 , a  launched in 1904 and discarded in 1924.
 , a  launched in 1927 and sunk in 1940.
 , a  launched in 1984.

Italian Navy ship names